The 1999 Minnesota Twins season  was the 39th season for the franchise in the Twin Cities of Minnesota, their eighteen season at Hubert H. Humphrey Metrodome and the 99th overall in the American League. They began their season on a positive note, with Brad Radke getting the win in a 6–1 victory over the Toronto Blue Jays. However, they finished the season in last place, with a 63–97 record.

Offseason
 October 2, 1998: Todd Ritchie was released by the Twins.
 December 14, 1998: Alex Ochoa was traded by the Twins to the Milwaukee Brewers for a player to be named later. The Brewers completed the deal by sending Darrell Nicholas (minors) to the Twins on December 15.
 December 15, 1998: Melvin Nieves was signed as a free agent by the Twins.
 December 21, 1998: George Williams was signed as a free agent by the Twins.
 January 27, 1999: Bob Wells was signed as a free agent by the Twins.
 February 16, 1999: Bobby Kielty was signed as an amateur free agent by the Twins.
 March 20, 1999: Melvin Nieves was purchased from the Twins by the Fukuoka Daiei Hawks.
 March 31, 1999: Dan Serafini was purchased from the Twins by the Chicago Cubs.

Regular season
Seventeen rookies saw playing time for manager Tom Kelly in the 1999 season.  Some of these rookies, such as Corey Koskie, Torii Hunter, and Joe Mays, would go on to future success.  The season was not without its bright spots, including Doug Mientkiewicz's .997 fielding percentage and Koskie's team-leading .310 batting average.  Another bright spot occurred on September 11, when pitcher Eric Milton threw the only no-hitter of his career against an Anaheim Angels team that consisted mainly of September call-ups.  However, the euphemism "rebuilding year" must be applied to the Twins' 1999 campaign.

On May 4, rookie Mike Lincoln pitched the Twins to their 3,000th victory.  It was Lincoln's first win in the major leagues, as he beat the Yankees 8-5 at the Metrodome.  Bert Blyleven was on the mound for both the Twins' 1,000th and 2,000th victories.
Win 1: Pedro Ramos, 1961.
Win 500: Jim Kaat, 1966.
Win 1000: Blyleven, 1973.
Win 1500: Roger Erickson, 1978.
Win 2000: Blyleven, 1986
Win 2500: Jack Morris, 1991

It was only May 21 when the team's brain trust realized that this would not be a world champion team.  On that day, the Twins traded Rick Aguilera, then their highest paid player, to the Chicago Cubs.  The team also traded Scott Downs and received Jason Ryan and future starter Kyle Lohse in return.  The team finished the season with a 63-97 record, ranked fifth in the American League Central Division.

The lone representative of the Twins in the All-Star Game was Ron Coomer.  He replaced Jim Thome at first base and went 0 for 1.

The highest paid Twin in 1999 was Rick Aguilera at $4,300,000; followed by Marty Cordova at $3,000,000.

Offense

The offense was not impressive.  Minnesota was last in the league in slugging and had only one more walk than the league-worst White Sox.  The team leaders were: Coomer with 16 home runs; Cordova with 70 RBI; Koskie with a .310 average; Walker with 148 hits and 37 doubles; and Lawton with 26 stolen bases.

Several players failed to meet expectations offensively.  In June, Lawton was hit in the face by a pitch.  He missed a month and had trouble finding his swing after returning.  Mientkiewicz had a great season batting-wise at the double-A level in 1998, but was not able to follow it up the following year at the major league level.

Pitching

Radke, Milton, and LaTroy Hawkins filled the first three spots in the starting rotation throughout the season.  The fourth and fifth spots were less predictable.  Mays did emerge as a capable starter midway through the season, making 20 starts.  Also making an appreciable number of starts in 1999 were Mike Lincoln (15), Dan Perkins (12), and Jason Ryan (8).

Aguilera started the season as the Twins' closer and recorded eight saves, but Mike Trombley took over the closer duties in May and finished the season with 24 saves.  Trombley, Bob Wells, Travis Miller, Eddie Guardado, and Héctor Carrasco had respectable seasons out of the bullpen.

Overall, the pitching staff allowed the second fewest walks in the American League and had an average ERA.

Defense

Like most of manager Tom Kelly's teams, this one was fundamentally sound.  For example, the team committed the third fewest errors in the major leagues in spite of its inexperience.

Chad Allen, Hunter, and Matt Lawton saw consistent playing time in the outfield.  However, Jacque Jones saw enough at bats to supplant Allen the following season, leading to the "Soul Patrol" of Jones, Hunter, and Lawton.  Terry Steinbach was the starting catcher, with Javier Valentín as his backup.  Three of the infield positions were fairly stable, with Mientkiewicz getting the bulk of the time at first base, Todd Walker at second, and Cristian Guzmán at short.  Although Coomer was the opening day third baseman, Koskie ended up playing the most games at that position.  (Coomer saw time at first when it became apparent that Mientkiewicz was not yet ready to face major-league pitchers.)  Brent Gates also saw substantial playing time at third, as well as second.  Marty Cordova played in 88 games as the designated hitter.

Season standings

Record vs. opponents

Roster

Notable transactions
 April 22: Jack Cressend was selected off waivers by the Twins from the Boston Red Sox.
 May 14: Midre Cummings was signed as a free agent by the Twins.
 May 21: Rick Aguilera and Scott Downs were traded by the Twins to the Chicago Cubs for Kyle Lohse and Jason Ryan.
 May 26: Frank Rodriguez was selected off waivers from the Twins by the Seattle Mariners.
 June 2: 1999 Major League Baseball draft
Rob Bowen was drafted by the Twins in the 2nd round.
Justin Morneau was drafted by the Twins in the 3rd round.
Terry Tiffee was drafted by the Twins in the 26th round.
 August 3, 1999: George Williams was traded by the Twins to the Houston Astros for Josh Dimmick (minors).

Player stats

Batting

Starters by position
Note: Pos = Position; G = Games played; AB = At bats; H = Hits; Avg. = Batting average; HR = Home runs; RBI = Runs batted in

Other batters
Note: G = Games played; AB = At bats; H = Hits; Avg. = Batting average; HR = Home runs; RBI = Runs batted in

Pitching

Starting pitchers
Note: G = Games pitched; IP = Innings pitched; W = Wins; L = Losses; ERA = Earned run average; SO = Strikeouts

Other pitchers
Note: G = Games pitched; IP = Innings pitched; W = Wins; L = Losses; ERA = Earned run average; SO = Strikeouts

Relief pitchers
Note: G = Games pitched; W = Wins; L = Losses; SV = Saves; ERA = Earned run average; SO = Strikeouts

Other post-season awards
Calvin R. Griffith Award (Most Valuable Twin) – Brad Radke
Joseph W. Haynes Award (Twins Pitcher of the Year) – Brad Radke
Bill Boni Award (Twins Outstanding Rookie) – Cristian Guzmán
Charles O. Johnson Award (Most Improved Twin) – Eric Milton
Dick Siebert Award (Upper Midwest Player of the Year) – Rick Helling
The above awards are voted on by the Twin Cities chapter of the BBWAA
Carl R. Pohlad Award (Outstanding Community Service) – Ron Coomer
Sherry Robertson Award (Twins Outstanding Farm System Player) – Michael Restovich

Farm system

References

External links
Diamond Mind's Analysis of the Twins' 1999 season
Player stats from www.baseball-reference.com
1999 Standings

Minnesota Twins seasons
Minnesota Twins season
1999 in sports in Minnesota